Dupuy is a municipality in northwestern Quebec, Canada, in the Abitibi-Ouest Regional County Municipality. It covers 123.48 km² and had a population of 930 as of the Canada 2011 Census.

The municipality was incorporated on September 10, 1918.

Demographics

Population

Language

Municipal council
 Mayor: Marc-André Côté
 Councillors: Gérald Arseneault, René Dessureault, Éric Lafontaine, Hélène Laliberté, Yvon Leclerc, Murielle Rossignol-Godin

See also
 List of municipalities in Quebec

References

Municipalities in Quebec
Incorporated places in Abitibi-Témiscamingue
Populated places established in 1918